Streptomyces triticirhizae is a bacterium species from the genus of Streptomyces which has been isolated from rhizosphereic soil.

See also 
 List of Streptomyces species

References 

triticirhizae
Bacteria described in 2020